"Out of Control" is a song by American rock band Hoobastank, released as the lead single from their second studio album, The Reason (2003). It charted at  16 on the US Hot Mainstream Rock Tracks chart and at No. 9 on the US Hot Modern Rock Tracks chart.

Music video
The music video was directed by Nathan Cox. It features the group going into a club and performs while getting dizzy as crowds cheer them on.

Charts

References

Hoobastank songs
2003 singles
2003 songs
Island Records singles
Songs written by Chris Hesse
Songs written by Dan Estrin
Songs written by Doug Robb